A monopropellant rocket (or "monochemical rocket") is a rocket that uses a single chemical as its propellant.

Chemical-reaction monopropellant rockets
For monopropellant rockets that depend on a chemical reaction, the power for the propulsive reaction and resultant thrust is provided by the chemical itself.  That is, the energy needed to propel the spacecraft is contained within the chemical bonds of the chemical molecules involved in the reaction.

The most commonly used monopropellant is hydrazine (N2H4), a chemical which is a strong reducing agent.  The most common catalyst is granular alumina (aluminum oxide) coated with iridium. These coated granules are usually under the commercial labels Aerojet S-405 (previously made by Shell) or W.C.Heraeus H-KC 12 GA (previously made by Kali Chemie). There is no igniter with hydrazine.  Aerojet S-405 is a spontaneous catalyst, that is, hydrazine decomposes on contact with the catalyst. The decomposition is highly exothermic and produces a  gas that is a mixture of nitrogen, hydrogen and ammonia. The main limiting factor of the monopropellant rocket is its life, which mainly depends on the life of the catalyst. The catalyst may be subject to catalytic poison and catalytic attrition which results in catalyst failure. Another monopropellant is hydrogen peroxide, which, when purified to 90% or higher concentration, is self-decomposing at high temperatures or when a catalyst is present.

Most chemical-reaction monopropellant rocket systems consist of a fuel tank, usually a titanium or aluminium sphere, with an ethylene-propylene rubber container or a surface tension propellant management device filled with the fuel. The tank is then pressurized with helium or nitrogen, which pushes the fuel out to the motors. A pipe leads from the tank to a poppet valve, and then to the decomposition chamber of the rocket motor. Typically, a satellite will have not just one motor, but two to twelve, each with its own valve.

The attitude control rocket motors for satellites and space probes are often very small,  or so in diameter, and mounted in groups that point in four directions (within a plane).

The rocket is fired when the computer sends direct current through a small electromagnet that opens the poppet valve. The firing is often very brief, a few milliseconds, and — if operated in air — would sound like a pebble thrown against a metal trash can; if on for long, it would make a piercing hiss.

Chemical-reaction monopropellants are not as efficient as some other propulsion technologies. Engineers choose monopropellant systems when the need for simplicity and reliability outweigh the need for high delivered impulse. If the propulsion system must produce large amounts of thrust, or have a high specific impulse, as on the main motor of an interplanetary spacecraft, other technologies are used.

Solar-thermal monopropellant thrusters
A concept to provide low Earth orbit (LEO) propellant depots that could be used as way-stations for other spacecraft to stop and refuel on the way to beyond-LEO missions has proposed that waste gaseous hydrogen—an inevitable byproduct of long-term liquid hydrogen storage in the radiative heat environment of space—would be usable as a monopropellant in a solar-thermal propulsion system.  The waste hydrogen would be productively utilized for both orbital stationkeeping and attitude control, as well as providing limited propellant and thrust to use for orbital maneuvers to better rendezvous with other spacecraft that would be inbound to receive fuel from the depot.

Solar-thermal monoprop thrusters are also integral to the design of a next-generation cryogenic upper stage rocket proposed by U.S. company United Launch Alliance (ULA).  The Advanced Common Evolved Stage (ACES) is intended as a lower-cost, more-capable and more-flexible upper stage that would supplement, and perhaps replace, the existing ULA Centaur and ULA Delta Cryogenic Second Stage (DCSS) upper stage vehicles.  The ACES Integrated Vehicle Fluids option eliminates all hydrazine and helium from the space vehicle—normally used for attitude control and station keeping—and depends instead on solar-thermal monoprop thrusters using waste hydrogen.

New developments
NASA is developing a new monopropellant propulsion system for small, cost-driven spacecraft with delta-v requirements in the range of 10–150 m/s. This system is based on a hydroxylammonium nitrate (HAN)/water/fuel monopropellant blend which is extremely dense, environmentally benign, and promises good performance and simplicity.

The EURENCO Bofors company produced LMP-103S as a 1-to-1 substitute for hydrazine by dissolving 65% ammonium dinitramide, NH4N(NO2)2, in 35% water solution of methanol and ammonia.  LMP-103S has 6% higher specific impulse and 30% higher impulse density than hydrazine monopropellant. Additionally, hydrazine is highly toxic and carcinogenic, while LMP-103S is only moderately toxic. LMP-103S is UN Class 1.4S allowing for transport on commercial aircraft, and was demonstrated on the Prisma satellite in 2010. Special handling is not required.  LMP-103S could replace hydrazine as the most commonly used monopropellant.

See also 
 Liquid-propellant rocket
 Mars Reconnaissance Orbiter
 Reaction wheel
 Nitrous oxide fuel blend

References

External links
 Technical Reports on Hydrogen Peroxide as a Monopropellant for Rockets
 USPAT 20090133788 Nitrous oxide fuel blend monopropellants

Rocket propulsion
Rocket engines by propellant
 
Rocket engines

pt:Foguete monopropulsor